The Osh State University is a public university in Osh, the second largest city in Kyrgyzstan. The university was originally established by the Kirghiz SSR in 1939 as a teacher training institute and was upgraded to a comprehensive pedagogical institute in 1951. The institute was awarded full university status in 1992 in the immediate aftermath of the dissolution of the Soviet Union.

Today, Osh State University is one of the leading universities of Kyrgyzstan and one important center of higher education outside of the capital city of Bishkek. The university enrolls around 40,000 students, with 3,000 of them being international students. Instruction is offered both in English and Russian.

Most of the foreign students study at the Medical Faculty. Other faculties include the Engineering Institute, the Business and Management Faculty, the Faculty of Law, the Pedagogical Faculty, the Faculty of Modern Languages, the Faculty of Mathematics, the Faculty of Computer Sciences and Electronics, and the Faculty of Arts.

History
Osh State University traces its origins back to 1939 with the founding of higher education teacher training institute in the city. The institute was established to address the shortage of teachers in schools in southern Kyrgyzstan. The institute was established by the decision of the Kirghiz Soviet Socialist Republic, one of the constituent republics of the Soviet Union. Future teachers received 2 years of training which included courses in history and philology, physics, mathematics and natural sciences and geography.

On 24 May 1951 Council of Ministers of the USSR adopted decision No. 1759 followed by the Council of Ministers of the Kyrgyz SSR No. 511-193-1 on 26 June 1951 which upgraded the Osh Teachers' Institute to the Osh Pedagogical Institute. The new institute was reorganized into faculties of philology, physics and mathematics and foreign languages. For the purposes of the implementation of reform, authorities allocated 1 million roubles.

Rectors

References

 https://www.4icu.org/reviews/3127.htm
 http://www.webometrics.info/en/asia/kyrgyzstan%20
 http://www.bolognakg.net/kg2/osu.htm
 https://web.archive.org/web/20170517061038/https://www.usaid.gov/kyrgyz-republic/press-releases/usaid-supports-osh-state-university-kyrgyzstan
 http://sustainabledevelopment.un.org/index.php?page=view&type=1006&menu=1348&nr=178

Universities in Kyrgyzstan
Osh
Universities established in the 1990s
Educational institutions established in 1939
1939 establishments in the Kirghiz Soviet Socialist Republic